Elisabeth Wild (6 February 1922 – 12 February 2020) was an  Austrian collage artist.

Early life and education
Born in Europe, Wild emigrated to Argentina with her parents in Franz and Stefanie Pollack in 1938. Wild studied painting at the Academy of Fine Arts Vienna, and drawing at the Círculo de Bellas Artes of Buenos Aires. In Buenos Aires, she worked as a textile designer, and later married a textile factory owner August Wild. In 1962 she and her husband sold their company and moved the family to Basel. In 2007 she moved to Guatemala to live with Vivian Suter, her daughter, in a former coffee plantation next to Lake Atitlán.

Career
Wild exhibited with her daughter Vivian Suter in several two-person shows, including at the Mistake Room in Los Angeles in 2015, Proyectos Ultravioleta in 2016, Karma International in Los Angeles in 2017, and The Power Plant in Toronto in 2018. In 2018 she exhibited at the Carbon 12 gallery in Dubai.

In 2017 she exhibited side-by-side with Suter at Documenta 14, in an exhibition curated by Adam Szymczyk.

She died at her home in Guatemala in 2020, aged 98.

Legacy
Rosalind Nashashibi's 2017 film Vivian’s Garden depicts the relationship of Wild and her artist daughter Vivian Suter.

In 2020 wild's cover design for the London Underground's pocket Tube map was published.

Her work is included in the Kontakt Collection and in the collection of the Art Institute of Chicago.

The book Elisabeth Wild: Fantasías, documenting Wild's collage work, was edited by Adam Szymczyk and published by MIT Press in 2021.

References

1922 births
2020 deaths
20th-century Austrian women artists
21st-century Austrian women artists
Artists from Vienna
Women collage artists
Austrian expatriates in Argentina
Austrian expatriates in Switzerland
Expatriates in Guatemala